Diana Gordon may refer to:
Diana Gordon (pen name), a pen name of Lucilla Andrews
Diana Gordon (singer), American singer/songwriter formerly known as Wynter Gordon
Diana Gordon, member of the fictional Gordon family in Saw

See also
Diane Gordon, U.S. politician